Tallahassee RollerGirls is a women's flat-track roller derby league based in Tallahassee, Florida. Founded in 2006, Tallahassee is a member of the Women's Flat Track Derby Association (WFTDA).

History and organization
The league was founded in 2006, and joined the Women's Flat Track Derby Association (WFTDA) in 2009 as a South Central Region league.  Florida State University student Adrianne Chaplin posted a flyer about roller derby and Melissa Smith responded, who organized the first meeting of 12 women in January 2006. The league practiced at a skating rink in Georgia prior to relocating to the Tallahassee Skate Inn. In 2012, the league moved to their current venue, the Hansel Tookes Center at Florida A&M University. Capital Punishment played their first game against Panama City March 24, 2007 and went on to win 6 out of 7 of their first season games, losing only to the Tampa Bay Derby Darlins. Their second season consisted of 7 wins and 1 loss to a home team of founding WFTDA member, Texas Rollergirls. In their third season (2009) the Jailbreak Betties, Tallahassee's second team, lost in their inaugural bout against Burn City Rollers from Auburn, Alabama. The league increased the number of bouts to 17 in 2010, and 23 in 2011 between the two teams.

Tallahassee Rollergirls has two travel teams, Capital Punishment and the Jailbreak Betties. Capital Punishment competes in interleague games which count towards WFTDA national rankings and the Jailbreak Betties function as a training league. Tallahassee also has two home teams, the Legiskators and the Sinators.

WFTDA competition
Capital Punishment began their 2012 season with a win against the Green Country Roller Girls who were ranked seventh in the South Central Region at the time. 2012 also marked the first time the league qualified as the ninth seed at the final WFTDA South Central Regional Tournament and finished in eighth place. In 2013, Tallahassee qualified for the newly created Division 2 Playoffs in Des Moines, Iowa, but finished in tenth place, ending their weekend with a 345–135 loss to DC Rollergirls.

Rankings

Community involvement
Tallahassee RollerGirls have donated proceeds to local and national charities in the past including Refuge House, National Public Radio, American Cancer Society, American Heart Association, and are founding members of the Oasis Center for Women & Girls. In addition to raising money for charities, some members founded Spread the Love Charity.

Spread the Love charity
Spread the Love charity was organized in November 2009 by teammates and friends of Stephanie "Danger S" Little shortly after she was diagnosed with cervical cancer. Danger S joined the Tallahassee RollerGirls earlier that year and was elected assistant coach before being diagnosed. She died in February 2010, but the Spread the Love Charity created to assist her now continues to fund exams for women in need and raise awareness of cervical cancer. The team uniform includes a patch in her memory that reads "Danger S. Ones".

References

Roller derby leagues in Florida
Non-profit organizations based in Florida
Women's sports in the United States
Sports in Tallahassee, Florida
Roller derby leagues established in 2006
2006 establishments in Florida